Bob Armstrong (1939–2020) was an American professional wrestler.

Bob Armstrong is also the name of:

Robert Armstrong (baseball) (1850–1917), known as Bob, American baseball player
Bob Armstrong (boxer) (1873–1933), heavyweight boxer
Bob Armstrong (ice hockey, born 1931) (1931–1990), Canadian ice hockey player
Bob Armstrong (ice hockey, born 1961), American ice hockey player
Bob Armstrong (politician) (1932–2015), member of the Texas House of Representatives
Bob Armstrong (basketball, born 1920) (1920–2009), American basketball player
Bob Armstrong (basketball, born 1933) (1933–2016), American basketball player
Bob Armstrong (Australian footballer) (1875–1951), Australian rules footballer
Bob Armstrong (English footballer) (1938–2014), English footballer
Bob Armstrong (public servant) (1911–1988), Australian public servant and policy maker

See also
Robert Armstrong (disambiguation)